Survivor: Heroes vs. Villains is the twentieth season of the American CBS competitive reality television series Survivor. Premiering on February 11, 2010, it was the show's fourth season to feature contestants from past seasons, after Survivor: All-Stars, Survivor: Guatemala, and Survivor: Micronesia, and was only the second season to feature a cast consisting entirely of returning players, after All-Stars. The season was filmed in Upolu, Samoa. Unlike previous seasons, the previous season and this season were filmed back-to-back with a commenced short break occurred between seasons due to budget circumstances over the worldwide Great Recession.

The twenty contestants were initially divided into two tribes based on their prior reputation in their previous seasons, Heroes and Villains. When ten players remained, the two tribes merged and named their new tribe "Yin Yang." After 39 days, Sandra Diaz-Twine became the first two-time Survivor winner, defeating Parvati Shallow and Russell Hantz with a vote of 6–3–0. Despite receiving zero jury votes, Hantz was voted by fans to win "Sprint Player of the Season" award for the second consecutive season and the $100,000 prize that went with it, earning the fans' vote over runner-up Rupert Boneham. Additionally, Hantz received a nomination in the 2010 Teen Choice Awards for his performance on this season.

Casting
According to host and producer Jeff Probst, the production initially selected 50 players from past seasons, narrowing down the list to twenty and keeping one spot open for a possible player from Survivor: Samoa. Some selections were made to match players that production thought would be exciting to see together, according to casting director Lynne Spillman.

Several notable omissions have been directly addressed by Probst, the production team, and former contestants over the years. While Richard Hatch, winner of the original Survivor, was asked to return for this season, he had to apply to leave the country since he was under house arrest at the time; his request was denied by a federal judge in Rhode Island. In an interview with Entertainment Weekly days before filming began, Probst revealed that Cook Islands winner Yul Kwon, Michael Skupin of The Australian Outback, and Terry Deitz of Panama had been considered for the "Heroes" tribe but were ultimately not chosen; Kwon, Skupin, and Deitz returned for Survivor: Winners at War, Survivor: Philippines, and Survivor: Cambodia, respectively. He also said that they had considered having Ozzy Lusth, of Cook Islands and Micronesia, compete for a third time, but had ultimately decided against it; Lusth returned for Survivor: South Pacific three seasons later, and again for Survivor: Game Changers in 2017. Thailand winner Brian Heidik was in talks to participate in this season, however, Probst and other producers felt "too repulsed" to include Heidik once again. Probst also revealed that the producers would have liked Elisabeth Hasselbeck from The Australian Outback and Colleen Haskell from Borneo to participate on this season, but knew neither of them would have accepted the offer. Another notable omission was that of Jonny Fairplay, of Pearl Islands and Micronesia, which led Probst to say that Fairplay was a "Survivor quitter" after asking to be voted off first in Micronesia, and quitters are not asked back. Shane Powers of Panama was cut and replaced by Russell Hantz of Survivor: Samoa. However, Jonathan Penner, of Cook Islands and Micronesia, claimed that his spot was revoked in favor of Hantz, but he would later return for Survivor: Philippines. Yau-Man Chan, of Fiji and Micronesia, and Corinne Kaplan of Gabon were asked to return, but had to decline due to work commitments. Kaplan was replaced by Danielle DiLorenzo, and would eventually return for Survivor: Caramoan. Natalie Bolton and Erik Reichenbach, both of Micronesia, were on site as alternates. Reichenbach would return for Survivor: Caramoan. According to episodes of the podcast Talking with T-Bird, Judd Sergeant of Survivor: Guatemala and Shii-Ann Huang, of Thailand and All-Stars, were both in the casting process for this season as well. Randy Bailey said that Ace Gordon of Gabon was close to coming back for this season as a member of the Villains tribe, but he was ultimately not chosen.  Coby Archa of Palau said that his castmate from that season, Ian Rosenberger, attended casting finals. Fiji winner Earl Cole was also considered for this season. Jenna Lewis, of Borneo and All-Stars, was considered for the Villains tribe. It was also revealed by Candice Cody that Parvati Shallow was originally supposed to be on the Heroes tribe, and her on the Villains tribe. Sierra Reed of Tocantins was originally going to be a member of the Heroes tribe, but she had to step down because she got engaged to a producer from her season.

Contestants

There were twenty contestants overall, divided into two tribes, Heroes and Villains. After ten contestants were eliminated, the tribes were combined, or merged, to form one tribe, Yin Yang. Nine contestants made up the jury, who ultimately decided who would win the game, and the $1 million grand prize.

Due to the back-to-back filming of Survivor: Samoa and this season, the other players did not have an opportunity to see Russell Hantz's gameplay in Samoa nor reveal more information about him; however, the players were told by the production crew that Hantz was considered "one of the five most notorious male villains of all time" prior to the start of the game.

Future appearances
Russell Hantz and Rob Mariano returned to compete once again in Survivor: Redemption Island. Hantz would later compete in Australian Survivor: Champions vs. Contenders at an international level. Benjamin "Coach" Wade returned to compete in Survivor: South Pacific. Rupert Boneham, Candice Woodcock, and Tyson Apostol returned for Survivor: Blood vs. Water. Boneham returned with his wife, Laura, who appeared in Heroes vs. Villains as a loved one and they would later compete on The Amazing Race 31 together; Woodcock, now using her husband's surname of Cody, returned with her husband John; and Apostol returned with his girlfriend (now wife), Rachel Foulger. Cirie Fields, James "J.T." Thomas Jr., and Sandra Diaz-Twine returned to compete in the 34th season of the show, Survivor: Game Changers. Diaz-Twine and Mariano returned in Survivor: Island of the Idols to serve as mentors. Diaz-Twine, Shallow, Mariano, and Apostol all returned to compete on Survivor: Winners at War. Diaz-Twine competed on Australian Survivor: Blood V Water with her daughter Nina. 

Outside of Survivor, Colby Donaldson hosted Top Shot, which ran on the History Channel for five seasons. He has also hosted other shows such as Top Guns, The Butcher, and Alone. Tyson Apostol competed on The Challenge: USA. Stephenie LaGrossa and Cirie Fields competed on the USA Network competition series Snake in the Grass. In 2023, LaGrossa and Fields also competed on the Peacock reality TV series The Traitors.

Season summary
The twenty returning castaways were divided into two tribes of ten based on their previous style of gameplay. The Villains dominated the earlier challenges due to Rob's leadership, only going to Tribal Council once in the first 14 days, and the Heroes were quickly whittled down to six members. The Villains tribe was divided into two factions: Rob's alliance of six, and the minority alliance of Russell, Parvati, and Danielle. At their second Tribal Council, Rob's alliance decided to split the vote between Russell and Parvati out of fear of Russell's hidden immunity idol. Rob's right-hand man Tyson, knowing that the minority alliance was voting for him, became uneasy and, following a confrontation from Russell, deviated from the plan, voting for Parvati instead of Russell. This error would prove fatal; Russell played his idol on Parvati, negating the four votes against her, and Tyson was voted out. The Villains lost the next Immunity Challenge and, due to Jerri aligning with Russell and Coach's inability to pick a side, Rob was voted out.

During the challenges after Rob's elimination, the Heroes were led to believe that the women of the tribe were methodically eliminating the men. J.T. found the Heroes' hidden idol, and the Heroes collectively agreed to sneak it to Russell during a challenge, the last male Villain remaining, with hopes that Russell would use it to eliminate Parvati and align with the Heroes at the merge. Instead, Russell shared the idol with Danielle, Jerri, and Parvati, unaware that Parvati and Danielle had also found the Villains' idol. Without Rob, the Villains lost the next two Immunity Challenges, leaving Sandra as the last remaining Villain outside of Russell's alliance of four.

With five Heroes and five Villains remaining, the tribes merged into Yin Yang. Russell crafted a story to explain the fate of the immunity idols, suggesting Parvati had played one against his. The Heroes took Russell's word, though Sandra, through Rupert, tried to warn them of Russell's duplicity. With Danielle winning the first individual immunity, Russell gave Parvati his idol prior to Tribal Council, believing the Heroes would target her. The Heroes became concerned on Russell's story, and changed their vote to target Jerri, believing her unlikely to possess an idol. At the vote, Parvati played both idols for both Jerri and Sandra, negating the Heroes' votes and eliminating J.T. Despite attempts to align with the Villains' majority, Heroes were consistently eliminated. However, after Russell realized that Parvati and Danielle's true loyalty was to each other, Russell betrayed Danielle, working with the remaining two Heroes to vote her out. After this, the final Heroes were eliminated, leaving Sandra, Russell, Parvati, and Jerri as the final four.

Russell, having won final immunity, felt he would have a better chance in the final tribal council against Sandra, who he felt did little in the game, over Jerri, who was the final player voted out. At the Final Tribal Council, Russell was lambasted for his poor social game, jury management, and open backstabbing. Parvati and Sandra both tried to sway the jury in their favor, with Parvati highlighting her social and physical game, as well as her idol play that changed the course of the season. However, Parvati was also lambasted for being extremely close with Russell throughout the entire game. Sandra argued the opposite, saying even though she was weak in challenges, she always interacted with both sides and still was involved in strategy. She also highlighted her loyalty to allies Courtney, Tyson, and Boston Rob, and campaigned for Russell's removal since day one. Parvati received jury votes from all the villains except Courtney, and Sandra received all the Heroes' votes plus Courtney's, making Sandra the first two-time winner in Survivor history.

In the case of multiple tribes or castaways who win reward or immunity, they are listed in order of finish, or alphabetically where it was a team effort; where one castaway won and invited others, the invitees are in brackets.

Episodes

Voting history

Production

Unlike previous seasons where a break in production occurred between seasons, the twentieth season was shot twenty days after Survivor: Samoa was completed, taking advantage of the existing infrastructure from that season. Casting for Heroes vs. Villains was done simultaneously with casting for Survivor: Samoa. Heroes vs. Villains features ten former Survivors known for their acts of integrity and honor, the Heroes, and ten former Survivors known for their deeds of deception and duplicity, the Villains. The cast was officially announced during the 36th People's Choice Awards on January 6, 2010. Jeff Probst, the show's host, stated that while they wanted to do another season where they brought back former players for the show's ten-year anniversary and 20th cycle, they did not want to simply do another All-Stars season. On reflecting on the most popular players, they realized that these players were either seen as liked or despised for those respective seasons, and opted to use that as the theme for this season. While the players were classified as Heroes or Villains, Survivors creator Mark Burnett did not expect these players to maintain these roles in the game, but rather to do what they need to survive to the end. Rather than the usual slogan "Outwit, Outplay, Outlast", the slogan for this season is "Return, Revenge, Redemption" as in case with Survivor: China. All challenges in this season were based on challenges used in previous seasons.

The 2009 Samoa earthquake and tsunami occurred shortly after the completion of filming for this season; a CBS spokesperson stated that no crew members were harmed from it.

Reception
Survivor: Heroes vs. Villains was met with universal acclaim, and is generally considered to be one of the show's best seasons. Entertainment Weekly'''s Survivor columnist Dalton Ross ranked Heroes vs. Villains as the third-best season of the series, only behind Survivor: Borneo and Survivor: Micronesia (both tied for first); he cited such memorable aspects as "the Russell vs. Boston Rob feud...Tyson voting himself off, J.T. giving Russell his immunity idol, and Parvati handing out two immunity idols at one Tribal Council." Ever since 2012, Survivor fan site "Survivor Oz" has consistently ranked Heroes vs. Villains at or near the #1 spot of its annual poll ranking all seasons of the series – it was #1 in 2012, 2013, and 2015, while it was #2 in 2014 (behind Survivor: Cagayan). The Wire and "The Purple Rock Podcast" both also rank Heroes vs. Villains as the greatest season of the series, while Examiner.com ranks it as the second best season behind Survivor: Borneo, and Zap2it ranks it as the 7th-best season. In 2015, former Survivor contestant and podcast host Rob Cesternino's website saw Heroes vs. Villains ranked as the #1 greatest season of the series, both by Cesternino himself and by the website's fan poll. The season was still ranked #1 in 2021 during Cesternino's podcast, Survivor All-Time Top 40 Rankings. In 2020, Inside Survivor ranked this season as the show's second-best out of the first 40 saying that "Heroes vs. Villains works so well despite the theme's silliness because of how so many cast members fully lean into their designated roles, regardless of how accurate they are. It is Survivor at its most theatrical, and everyone comes to Samoa ready to play their parts." In 2021, Kristen Kranz of Collider also ranked Heroes vs. Villians as the second-best season of the series writing, "labeling one group heroes and the other villains was a brilliant strategy for this season of all-star returning players. Not only did we get to watch the villains try to out-villain each other, but we also watched as the heroes considered their methods and play around with the villain role a bit this time around," while also adding that season's players "were the cream of the crop," and that, "Usually, contestants get to decide for themselves which side they belong on, but this season was a chance to prove whether these players were worth the title of hero or villain and if they would change sides if the opportunity presented itself." Critics considered the season to be a strong contender for the Primetime Emmy Award for Outstanding Reality-Competition Program at the 62nd Primetime Emmy Awards, but it was not nominated. Newsweek, IGN, The Hollywood Reporter and Entertainment Weekly all listed this pass up as one of the biggest Emmy snubs for the year.

In the official CBS Watch issue commemorating the 15th anniversary of Survivor, Heroes vs. Villains performed extremely well across all six major polls that were held: It was voted by viewers as the #1 greatest season of the series; Sandra's burning of Russell's hat in the final episode was voted as the #1 most memorable moment, and Parvati handing out two immunity idols in the 10th episode was #8 on the same list (thus making this the only season to have more than one entry in that particular list); five of the top ten contestants voted by viewers as the greatest were in this season (Mariano, Hantz, Shallow, Diaz-Twine, and Fields); the final immunity challenge of the season was voted as the #5 most unforgettable challenge; and in the "most attractive" polls for both males and females, Donaldson ranked second in the male category, while in the female category, Shallow ranked second, Kimmel ranked fourth, and Woodcock ranked sixth (thus tying with Micronesia for the highest amount of entries in the female category).

In a 2015 interview, Jeff Probst admitted that, if Borneo is not taken into consideration, then Heroes vs. Villains ties with Cagayan as his personal favorite Survivor'' season.

References

External links
 Official Survivor: Heroes vs. Villains Website

2009 in Samoa
2010 American television seasons
20
Television shows filmed in Samoa